Aditya Jain (born 11 June 1986) is an Indian former cricketer. He played sixteen first-class matches for Delhi between 2006 and 2010.

See also
 List of Delhi cricketers

References

External links
 

1986 births
Living people
Indian cricketers
Delhi cricketers
Sportspeople from Agra